Stay in Memory is the ninth studio album by South Korean pianist Yiruma, his first under Sony Music Entertainment.

Track listing

References

2012 albums
Yiruma albums
Sony Music albums